The Pole Creek Wilderness is located on the high rhyolite and basalt plateaus of Owyhee County in southwestern Idaho in the western United States.  Its whitewater rapids are a popular attraction.

Geography
These canyons in Owyhee County have been called "the largest concentration of sheer-walled volcanic rhyolite and basalt canyons in the western United States". There are no designated trails.

Legislative history
The Pole Creek Wilderness was created by the Omnibus Public Land Management Act of 2009. Also created in the Omnibus Land Act were five additional southwestern Idaho wilderness areas in Owyhee County, collectively known as the Owyhee Canyonlands Wilderness Areas:

 Big Jacks Creek Wilderness - 
 Bruneau – Jarbidge Rivers Wilderness - 
 Little Jacks Creek Wilderness - 
 North Fork Owyhee Wilderness - 
 Owyhee River Wilderness  - 

The act of 2009 added  of wilderness within the state of Idaho.

Natural history
The Pole Creek Wilderness lies within the Owyhee Desert, part of the northern Basin and Range ecoregion, although hydrologically the wilderness area is within the Snake River – Columbia River drainage. The area is home to mule deer, pronghorn, bighorn sheep, sage grouse, hawks, eagles, falcons, songbirds and many rare plants.

See also
 List of largest wilderness areas in the United States
 List of U.S. Wilderness Areas
 Wilderness Act

References

External links

 Owyhee Uplands Backcountry Byway - Bureau of Land Management

Wilderness areas of Idaho
Protected areas of Owyhee County, Idaho
Owyhee River
Bureau of Land Management areas in Idaho
Protected areas established in 2009